Indian Institute of Pulses Research (IIPR) is a government institute in Kanpur, Uttar Pradesh It was established in the year 1983 by the Indian Council of Agricultural Research (ICAR) to carry out basic strategic and applied research on major pulse crops.  It is situated on Grand Trunk Road and is about twelve kilometer from Kanpur Central Railway Station towards New Delhi. The overall climate varies from semi-arid to sub-humid and mean annual rainfall ranges from 800 to 1000mm.

History
The institute has started its journey as All India Coordinated Pulses Improvement Project (AICPIP) at Indian Agricultural Research  Institute (IARI), New Delhi in 1966. Later in 1978, its headquarters was shifted to the  then Regional Station of IARI at Kanpur under the  name of Project Directorate (Pulses). It was further elevated as Directorate of Pulses Research (DPR) in 1984 and became an independent entity under the direct control of ICAR.

Research
The Institute develops appropriate production and protection technologies, production and supply of breeder seeds of improved varieties, demonstration and transfer of technologies and strategic coordination of pulse research through wide network of testing centers across the country.

References

 IIPR

External links
 IIPR Organisation Setup
 IIPR Research Programs

Indian Council of Agricultural Research
Education in Kanpur
Educational institutions established in 1983
1983 establishments in Uttar Pradesh
Legumes
Agricultural research institutes in Uttar Pradesh
Organisations based in Kanpur